Vision Street Wear is an American apparel company focused on BMX and skateboarding. Started in 1976 by Brad Dorfman, the company sponsored early skateboarding greats such as Mark 'Gator' Rogowski, and Mark Gonzales.

Although the company is mostly known for its skateboards, it also commercialises a clothing line that includes t-shirts, hoodies, and shorts.

History

Launching 
In 1984 Vision sports released their first pro model skateboard for skater Mark 'Gator' Rogowski designed by Greg Evans. This was followed by a release of a pro model deck for skater Mark Gonzales (1985) and the iconic "Psycho Stick" (1986), both designed by Los Angeles-based artist Andy Takakjian. Soon after, Vision entered into a licensing agreement with SIMS Skateboards, to produce and market the SIMS brand. Gonzales went on to release a few more pro models with Vision before departing to form Blind Skateboards (a play-on-words with Vision) with World Industries.

Vision Street Wear brand 
With a surging popularity of skateboarding in the mid 1980s, Vision Sports launched the 'Vision Street Wear' brand, making clothing, and later shoes, as well as shifting targeting to include the BMX industry. The bold logo was designed by Greg Evans and inspired by the Frankie Goes to Hollywood "FRANKIE SAYS RELAX" t-shirts popular in summer 1984.

Brand Sale & Licensing 
The 'Vision' trademark was sold in 2004 to Collective Brands, a subsidiary of Payless ShoeSource. In 2009, the company attempted to relaunch the Vision brand with an exclusive deal through Finish Line.

In 2014, Authentic Brands Group LLC acquired the licensing rights to Vision from Collective Brands.

In popular culture
The Vision Psycho Stick skateboard is featured on the 1987 INXS album Kick. 

A Vision shirt is prominently featured in the 1990 music video for EMF's Unbelievable.

Brazilian drummer Igor Cavalera, formerly of Sepultura, was seen wearing a Vision shirt during the band's performance on Matéria Prima in 1991.

References

External links
 
 A Gallery of Vision Skateboard Decks

Skateboarding companies
Clothing companies established in 1986
Sportswear brands
1980s fashion
Skateboard shoe companies
Authentic Brands Group